NGC 4999 is a barred spiral galaxy located in the constellation Virgo, first discovered February 24, 1786 by astronomer William Herschel. The galaxy is noted as a particularly bright ultraviolet light source – it is believed that its notable bar structure suppresses star formation, indicating this ultraviolet light may possibly be due to a quasi-stellar object.

See also
New General Catalogue

References 

4999
Barred spiral galaxies
Virgo (constellation)